Hostel film series, consists of American splatter-horror films, including two theatrical movies, and one straight-to-home release film. The plot centers around a Slovakia criminal organization that lures innocent foreigners into their hostels, where they have wealthy sadists bid upon them for torture and murder. Over the course of the films, the hierarchy of the cult group is revealed to operate internationally.

The original movie starring Jay Hernandez was met with mixed critical reception, though it was success at the box office. The second installment was met with an even more divided critical response, and though it earned less than its predecessor it earned a profit for the studios. The third film was released to more positive reviews from critics than the previous movies, although its monetary statistics regarding sales on home media are not disclosed.

Films

Hostel (2006) 

Paxton and Josh spend their summer after graduating college traveling the various countries in Europe. Exploring all manner of debaucherous activities, they befriend an Icelandic tourist named Óli. One night they trio are locked out of their hotel, and visit an apartment of a local named Alexei. After being told of a hostel run by seductive women in Slovakia, the friends make the journey to the rumored location. Upon arrival they are pleased to find that Alexei's story was true, a location overrun by nude foreign women. As they engage in various sexual encounters, over time they soon begin to question the intentions of the establishment. As Óli goes missing, the friends attempt to investigate his disappearance. When they are drugged by a pair of women that they had been associating in a sex-based relationship, they individually awaken to a horrific underground torture event, lead by a secret organization. The company allows wealthy individuals to pay large amounts of money to torture, maim, and kill abducted innocent tourists. Unwittingly finding themselves a part of the cult's activities, Paxton and Josh must fight for survival in the nightmare they've awoken in, or die by a series of gory events.

Hostel: Part II (2007) 

After narrowly escaping the tortures of an evil secret organization, Paxton suffers from extreme episodes of PTSD. Convinced that the Elite Hunting Club will not stop looking for him until he is dead, he often comes into confrontation with his girlfriend who argues that his experience is exaggerated as a result of his mental illness. After one particularly heated argument, she awakes in horror the next morning to his headless corpse sitting in their kitchen; his dismemberment a confirmation of his horrific stories.

In Rome, Italy three young American art students named Beth, Whitney, and Lorna are enjoying their time abroad in a foreign country. Encouraged by one of the nude models that they are sketching named Axelle, to visit a relaxing hostel located in Slovakia, the trio decide to make the journey to the isolated location. Expecting a relaxing stay at a luxurious spa, the friends quickly begin to question the underlying reality of what is going on around them. Unbeknownst to them, upon arrival their passports are uploaded for bid to the highest spender. Abducted by members of the organization, the friends awaken to a reality where they are positioned to be helpless pawns of torture and murder. The women resolve to fight for their survival, or die trying.

Hostel: Part III (2011) 

Scott alongside his friends Mike and Justin, are celebrating a night of decadence in Las Vegas for his bachelor party. As they move through each club, they are persuaded by a pair of escorts to attend a secluded private party. The friends decide to take their partying up a level, and make the trip. Upon arrival they quickly learn that things are not as they seem. Imprisoned by the Sokovian hosts, they find that they are intended to be used as party favors of nefarious wealthy bidders, who intend to torture, abuse, and kill them as they desire. As they fight for their survival, amongst a terrible bloodbath Scott soon discovers that one of his friends is also a part of the Elite Hunters Club and willingly led them into the sadistic nightmare they are trapped in.

Principal cast and characters

Additional crew and production details

Reception

Box office and financial performance

Critical and public response

References 

Film series introduced in 2006
Horror film series
American horror films
Icelandic-language films
Dutch-language films
Slovak-language films
Lionsgate films
Films about human trafficking
Torture in films
Splatterpunk